Karnal railway station (station code: KUN), at an altitude of  above mean sea level, is a class "A" station on Delhi–Kalka line, located in Karnal district of Haryana state of India. Built in 1892 by the British Raj, it is one of the oldest stations in India which also holds the title of country's National Heritage Site. It is under Delhi railway division (DRD) of Northern Railway zone (NR) of the Indian Railways (IR).

History

In 1891, the Delhi–Panipat–Ambala–Kalka line was opened. In 1892, Karnal station was built during the British Raj. From 1800 to 1845, Karnal was a British cantonment. The vintage historical Karnal railway station is located on the DUK route.

Future projects

In July 2021, the union government approved the Karnal-Yamunanagar line. After the construction of this new rail line, Karnal railway station will become a railway junction via new Greenfield Karnal–Yamuna Nagar railway line via Indri, Ladwa, Radaur, Daamla, Jagadhari Workshop railway station. The Detailed Project Report (DPR) was approved by the Haryana Government & submitted on 3 September 2019 to Indian Railway Board, Ministry of Railways of Government of India. The existing rail route from Karnal to Yamunanagar is via Ambala Cantt which is 121 Km. Whereas, proposed route will be 61 km and also connected with unserved regions like Indri, Ladwa and Radaur.

In March 2022, MP Sanjay Bhatia from Bhartiya Janta Party (BJP) raised the issue on much awaited and controversial Karnal-Yamunanagar railway line project in the parliament. Bhatia said that this project is being continuously delayed and therefore requested its completion soon to the Ministry of Indian Railways. In addition to it, Railway Minister Ashwini Vaishnaw replied that this line doesn't seem to be much useful and is financially unviable as well. However, Sanjay Bhatia still claims that this line will be constructed for sure and is not cancelled by the ministry instead it is under review and being actively modified. The demand for Karnal-Yamunanagar line by the natives has been since 1998 which makes it one of the most awaited and demanded railway line projects of its kind. Furthermore, Sanjay Bhatia also demanded the upgrade of Karnal Railway Station to a Junction Station to the Ministry.

Rail network

As of 2021, the station has one line and another line has been approved.

 Delhi–Panipat–Karnal–Ambala–Kalka line: It is also called DUK route. Nearby stations on this route are Bazida Jatan, Gharaunda, Kohand, Babarpur, Panipat jn towards Delhi in the south, while in north direction it has Bhaini Khurd, Taraori, Nilokheri, Amin, Kurukshetra jn towards Ambala Cantonment, Amritsar, and Chandigarh.
 Karnal-Yamunanagar line: Approved and yet to be constructed. After the construction of this new rail line, Karnal railway station will become a railway junction via Karnal, Indri, Ladwa, Radaur, Daamla, Jagadhari Workshop railway station.

Trains at Karnal

As of April 2022, a total of around 105-115 trains pass through Karnal Railway Station daily  from which only 50-60 trains halt here. Some of the major trains at Karnal are:

 Ajmer–Jammu Pooja SuperFast Express
 Delhi–Amb Andaura Himachal Express
 Howrah–Kalka Mail
 Delhi–Shri Mata Vaishno Devi Katra Jammu Mail
 Ajmer–Chandigarh Garib Rath
 New Delhi–Chandigarh Shatabdi Express
 Prayagraj Sangam–Chandigarh Unchahar Express
 Jammu–Pune Jhelum Express
 Dr. Ambedkar Nagar–Shri Mata Vaishno Devi Katra Malwa Superfast Express
 Chandigarh–Bandra Superfast
 Bhiwani–Kalka Ekta Express
 Haridwar–Bikaner Express
 Delhi–Kalka Himalayan Queen
 Una Himachal–Delhi Janshatabdi
 Delhi–Amritsar Shaan-e-Punjab Superfast
 Amritsar–Nanded Sachkhand Express
 Bandra–Amritsar Paschim Express

See also 

 Railway in Haryana
 Highways in Haryana
 Haryana Tourism

References

Karnal
Delhi railway division